Darreh Vazan-e Olya (also Romanized as Darreh Vazān-e ‘Olyā; also known as Darreh Vazān-e Bālā) is a village in Saheb Rural District, Ziviyeh District, Saqqez County, Kurdistan Province, Iran. At the 2006 census, its population was 101, in 16 families. The village is populated by Kurds.

References 

Towns and villages in Saqqez County
Kurdish settlements in Kurdistan Province